Bliss is Norwegian singer Tone Damli's first studio album. The album was released on 5 December 2005 and was produced by Geir Sundstøl. The album peaked at number 14 on the Norwegian Albums Chart.

Track listing
 "The Bliss Song"
 "End of an Affair"
 "Keep on Keeping On"
 "The Moon is a Harsh Mistress" (Jimmy Webb)
 "Lazy Day in Bed"
 "Somewhere Soft to Land"
 "Songbird"
 "Everything That I Am"
 "High Hopes"
 "I´ll Get Myself Together"
 "Burn for You"
 "The Bliss Song" (video)

Charts

Release history

References

2005 debut albums
Tone Damli albums